Spearwood railway station was a railway station on the Transperth network. It was located on the Spearwood-Armadale line,  from Perth station in Spearwood.

History
On 1 April 1906, the Spearwood-Armadale line opened from a junction with the Fremantle line at Robbs Jetty to Jandakot, being extended to connect with the South Western Railway at Armadale on 15 July 1907. In 1909, some of the buildings from Jandakot station were moved to Spearwood station. The station was little more than a raised wooden platform covered with dirt and a couple of wooden sheds. Initially only served by freight trains, a passenger service began in 1913.

Spearwood didn't gain a station platform until after 1923. It was the last station on the line to get a platform.

Passenger services ceased on the line in the 1950s, running after that time for only special occasions such as the Perth Royal Show, for employees of the Watsonia factory.

The Jandakot line was curtailed to become a freight only line to Bibra Lake in the 1960s, with the final section closing in 1991. The section through Spearwood became part of the Fremantle to Forrestfield freight line after alterations to the line were made for the 1987 America's Cup. All that is left of the station are a few wooden posts stuck in the dirt.

References

External links

http://ineptmodeller.blogspot.com.au/2012/04/fremantle-to-armadale-line-part-2.html
Cockburn - Fremantle track layout SA Track & Signal
Gallery History of Western Australian Railways & Stations

City of Cockburn
Disused railway stations in Western Australia